The Neubauer Collegium for Culture and Society is a collaborative research center located on the campus of the University of Chicago in Chicago, Illinois.

History 

The Neubauer Collegium was established in June 2012.  It was founded with a gift of $26.5-million  from Joseph Neubauer, former CEO and chairman of Aramark Corporation, and  Jeanette Lerman-Neubauer, founder of the  Philadelphia marketing and communications firm, J.P. Lerman & Company.  A second major gift came from Emmanuel Roman, CEO of PIMCO and a University of Chicago graduate in whose honor the head of the Collegium is named the Roman Family Director. Gallery exhibitions at the Neubauer Collegium, along with other projects addressing themes such as the environment and media, are supported by the Brenda Mulmed Shapiro Fund.

The inaugural cohort of 18 faculty research projects were announced in March 2013 and represented faculty from 17 departments, as well as the Chicago Booth School of Business, the Divinity School, the Law School, the Pritzker School of Medicine, and the Oriental Institute. The center launched its tenth cohort of new research projects on July 1, 2022, bringing the total number of faculty-led research projects at the center to 117.

Campus 

The collegium occupies an historic 16,000 sq. ft. Collegiate Gothic style building erected in 1933 as the home of the Meadville Lombard Theological School, adjacent to the campus of the University of Chicago in Hyde Park which was purchased by the University in 2011 and was renovated by Kliment Halsband Architects.

Leadership 

David Nirenberg served as the inaugural faculty director of the Neubauer Collegium from 2012 to 2014. Jonathan Lear, the John U. Nef Distinguished Service Professor at the Committee on Social Thought and in the Department of Philosophy, was named Roman Family Director of the Neubauer Collegium for Culture and Society in October, 2014. Lear stepped down in June 2022, and Tara Zahra, Homer J. Livingston Professor of East European History and the College, has served as Roman Family Director since July 2022.

An advisory board comprising faculty from across the University works closely with the director. Board members serve for three-year terms and assist with governance and the annual selection of faculty-led research projects. Current members of the board are listed on the Neubauer Collegium website. Former members of the advisory board include:
 Frances Ferguson, Ann L. and Lawrence B. Buttenwieser Professor, Department of English Language and Literature
 Susan Goldin-Meadow, Beardsley Ruml Distinguished Service Professor, Department of Psychology and Committee on Human Development
 John Goldsmith, Edward Carson Waller Distinguished Service Professor, Departments of Computer Science and Linguistics
 John Mark Hansen, Charles L. Hutchinson Distinguished Service Professor, Political Science and the college; Senior Advisor to President Zimmer
 Karin Knorr Cetina, George Wells Beadle Chair Distinguished Service Professor, Department of Sociology
 Kenneth Pomeranz, University Professor, Modern Chinese History and the college; Department Chair, History
 David N. Rodowick, Glen A. Lloyd Distinguished Service Professor, Cinema and Media Studies and the College
 Mark Siegler, Lindy Bergman Distinguished Service Professor of Medicine and Surgery; Executive Director, Bucksbaum Institute for Clinical Excellence; Director, MacLean Center for Clinical Medical Ethics
 Marianne Bertrand, Chris P. Dialynas Distinguished Service Professor of Economics
 Dipesh Chakrabarty, Lawrence A. Klimpton Distinguished Service Professor in History, South Asian Languages and Civilizations, and the College
 Lorraine Daston, Visiting Professor of Social Thought and History
 Judith Farquhar, Max Palevsky Professor of Anthropology and of Social Sciences, the College
 David Levin, Addie Clark Harding Professor in Germanic Studies, Theater and Performance Studies, and the college; Director, Gray Center for Arts & Inquiry
 Haun Saussy, University Professor in Comparative Literature, and the College
 Candace Vogler, David B. and Clara E. Stern Professor in Philosophy and the college; Chair, Philosophy

References

External links 
Neubauer Collegium

2012 establishments in Illinois
Research institutes in Illinois
University of Chicago
Art museums and galleries in Chicago